Cheryl Lynn is the  first studio album by the American singer Cheryl Lynn. It was officially released on October 13, 1978, by Columbia Records and included Lynn's first single and biggest hit "Got to Be Real". The album reached #23 on the U.S. pop albums charts and is regarded as her best record. It was certified Gold on February 23, 1979.

Track listing

Personnel
Cheryl Lynn – lead and backing vocals
Tracks 1, 2, 3, 5, 6
Drums – James Gadson
Bass – David Shields
Guitar – Ray Parker Jr.
Keyboards – David Paich
Tracks 4, 7, 9
Drums – Bernard Purdie
Bass – Chuck Rainey
Guitar – David T. Walker
Keyboards – Richard Tee, David Paich, Marty Paich
D. J. Rogers – vocals on track 7
Track 8
Drums – Bernard Purdie
Bass – Chuck Rainey
Guitar – David T. Walker, Steve Lukather
Keyboards – Richard Tee, David Paich, Marty Paich
Woodwinds – Ronnie Lang, Ted Nash, Gene Cipriano, Ernie Watts, Pete Christlieb
Trumpets – Chuck Findley, Steve Madaio, Bobby Findley, Gary Grant, Bobby Shew, Dalton Smith
Trombones – Lew McCreary, Dick Nash, Dick Hyde
Percussion – Harvey Mason, Joe Porcaro, Bobbye Hall
Strings concertmaster – Sid Sharp
Rhythm, string and horn arrangements – David and Marty Paich

Charts

Singles

References

External links
 Cheryl Lynn at Discogs

1978 debut albums
Cheryl Lynn albums
Columbia Records albums